"Long Distance Call" is an episode on the 1959 television series The Twilight Zone.

Long Distance Call can also refer to:
"Long Distance Call" (Supernatural), an episode of the American television series Supernatural
"Long Distance Call" (Muddy Waters song), 1951
"Long Distance Call" (song), a 2006 single by the French band Phoenix

See also
Long Distance Calling (disambiguation)